Conospermum tenuifolium is a shrub of the family Proteaceae native to eastern Australia.

References

External links

tenuifolium
Flora of New South Wales
Taxa named by Robert Brown (botanist, born 1773)